Adolf Wilhelm Edelsvärd (28 June 1824 – 15 October 1919) was a Swedish architect,  engineer and military officer.

Biography
Edelsvärd was born at Östersund in Jämtland, Sweden.  His father, Fredrik Wilhelm Edelsvärd, was a military officer and engineer. 
He studied civil architecture, both in Sweden and in England. He was promoted to lieutenant in the Dalarna Regiment in 1844.  He served as head architect for the Swedish National Railways (Statens Järnvägar)  from 1855–1895.

His designs included the Gothenburg Central Station (1856), Norrköping Central station (1865), Uppsala Central station (1865), Stockholm  
Central Station (1869) and  Malmö Central station  (1890). He also designed the  exhibition hall in Kungsträdgården for the General Industrial Exposition of Stockholm (1866).

Gallery

References and notes

Further reading

External links

1824 births
1919 deaths
People from Östersund
Swedish military engineers
Swedish architects
Swedish engineers
Members of the Royal Swedish Academy of Arts
Members of the Royal Swedish Academy of Agriculture and Forestry